Espanto may refer to:

People
Darren Espanto (born 2001), Filipino-Canadian singer and actor
Espanto I (1930-1968), Mexican professional wrestler
Espanto II (1932-2010), Mexican professional wrestler
Espanto III (1940-1996), Mexican professional wrestler
Espanto Jr. (born 1956), Mexican professional wrestler
Espanto Jr. (CMLL) (born 1986), Mexican professional wrestler

Places
Cayo Espanto, island in Belize

See also
Espanto IV and V, professional wrestling tag team
Los Hijos del Espanto, professional wrestling tag team
Los Espantos, professional wrestling stable